Raorchestes silentvalley or Silent Valley bushfrog is a species of tree frog endemic to the Nilgiri Hills of southern India and belongs to the species-rich Asian genus Raorchestes. The species was described in June, 2016 and has been found to have a very restricted distribution on the southwestern slopes of the Nilgiri Hills in the Silent Valley National Park. These frogs are variable in colour but distinct in pattern and calls.

The species was described from the southern edge of the Nilgiris in the Silent Valley region. They are variable in colour but are green above with patterns of black blotches and spots. The underside is yellow with black or purple spots and streaks. The toe-pads are purplish. They have a distinct advertisement call given from tree perches at about 2 metres above the ground.

References

silentvalley
Amphibians described in 2016